Mathias Trettenes (born November 8, 1993) is a Norwegian professional ice hockey forward who currently plays for HC La Chaux-de-Fonds in the Swiss League (SL).

Playing career
Trettenes played as a youth in Sweden as a part of the junior program Modo Hockey. He began his professional career in his native Norway, playing with the Stavanger Oilers of the GET-ligaen. After five seasons with the Oilers, he returned to Sweden to play the 2016–17 season, with Almtuna IS of the HockeyAllsvenskan.

After a single season with Almtuna, Trettenes opted to move to Germany in agreeing to a one-year deal with Krefeld Pinguine of the DEL on June 7, 2017.
In the 2018–19 season, his second with the Krefeld, Trettenes contributed with 10 points in 44 games before leaving as a free agent at the conclusion of the year.

On May 4, 2020, Trettenes joined HC La Chaux-de-Fonds of the second-tier Swiss League (SL) on a one-year deal.

Career statistics

Regular season and playoffs

International

References

External links

1993 births
Living people
Almtuna IS players
Krefeld Pinguine players
Norwegian expatriate sportspeople in Germany
Norwegian expatriate sportspeople in Sweden
Norwegian ice hockey centres
Stavanger Oilers players
Sportspeople from Stavanger
Ice hockey players at the 2018 Winter Olympics
Olympic ice hockey players of Norway